Goldstone Catena (Goldstone Vallis until March 2013) is a catena on Mercury located at 15.8 S, 31.7 W. It is named after Goldstone Observatory. While it superficially resembles a graben, it is a chain of overlapping secondary craters.

References

Surface features of Mercury